Remengesau is a surname. Notable people with the surname include:
Thomas Remengesau, Sr. (1929–2019), Palauan politician
Tommy Remengesau (born 1956), Palauan politician
Valerie Whipps (née Remengesau), Palauan First Lady

Surnames of Oceanian origin